The John Doe law is a prosecution tool in Wisconsin. John Doe investigations are done to determine whether a crime has occurred and, if so, by whom.

See also
Fictitious defendants

References

Wisconsin law